Aventure Malgache (1944) is a short British propaganda film in French directed by Alfred Hitchcock for the British Ministry of Information. The title means Malagasy Adventure in English.

There are conflicting reports as to the true inspiration for the film, lawyer Jules François Clermont or actor Claude Dauphin. Some sources claim the film is based on the real-life activities of Jules François Clermont, who wrote and starred in the film under the name "Paul Clarus". In September 2011, The Daily Telegraph published an article noting that writer and actor Claude Dauphin had collaborated with Hitchcock to recount his own experiences of operating an underground radio station in Nazi occupied France.

Plot summary 
Paul Clarus, a French actor, is chatting with his fellow actors (the "Molière Players") as they put on their makeup before a performance. He reminisces about a very unpleasant Vichy official, the Chef de la Sûreté, whom he knew when he was part of the Resistance on the island of Madagascar during the Second World War. The events on Madagascar are shown in flashback.

Paul Clarus pretended to be loyal to the Vichy official, while he simultaneously worked as the head of the Resistance movement. He ran an illegal pro-Resistance radio station "Madagascar Libre", and helped arrange numerous boats to take loyal Frenchmen out of the island to safety. Finally when the Vichy government falls, we see that the Vichy official is nothing but a turncoat; in his office he rapidly replaces a portrait of Marshal Philippe Pétain with a portrait of Queen Victoria, and he changes his bottle of Vichy water for bottles of Scotch and soda water.

Cast 
Paul Bonifas as Michel - Chef de la Sûreté (Leader of the Sûreté)
Paul Clarus as himself
Jean Dattas as man behind Michel, reading a telegram
Andre Frere as Pierre
Guy Le Feuvre as General
Paulette Preney as Yvonne

Home media
Milestone Films has released Aventure Malgache, paired with other 1944 French language Hitchcock short film Bon Voyage, on DVD and VHS.

See also
List of World War II short films

References

External links 

1944 films
British black-and-white films
British World War II propaganda shorts
Films directed by Alfred Hitchcock
1940s French-language films